Henry of Meissen or Heinrich von Meissen refers to two medieval German poets from Meissen:
Heinrich Frauenlob (1250s–1318), Middle High German poet
Henry III, Margrave of Meissen (1215–1288), noble and minnesinger